Devata (pl: devatas, meaning 'the gods') (Devanagari: देवता; Khmer: ទេវតា (tevoda); Thai: เทวดา (tevada); Javanese, Balinese, Sundanese, Malay: dewata; Batak languages: debata (Toba), dibata (Karo), naibata (Simalungun); diwata (Philippine languages)) are smaller and more focused Devas (Deities) in Indian religions, such as Hinduism and Buddhism. The term "devata" itself can also mean deva. They can be either male or female. Every human activity has its devata, its spiritual counterpart or aspect.

Types

There are many kinds of devatas: vanadevatas (forest spirits, perhaps descendants of early nature-spirit cults), gramadevata (village gods), devatas of river crossings, caves, mountains, and so on. For example, in the Konkan region of India, Hindu devatas are often divided into five categories:

 Grama devatas or village deities who could be the founder deity such as Jathera or ancestral worship of Bali, and examples include Santoshi, Renuka, Aiyanar
 Sthana devatas or local deities, for example, those in certain places of pilgrimage like Rama in Nasik, Vithoba in Pandharpur, Krishna at Dwarka, Kali at Kolkata, Mahalakshmi at Kolhapur, Devi Kanya Kumari at Kanyakumari
 Kula devatas or family deities, like Khanderai and Muniandi
 Ishta devatas or chosen deities
 Vastu devatas or Gruha devatas, a class of deities that preside over the house.
Following are some of the important types of Devatas in Sri Lankan Buddhism:

 Bandara Devathavo are devatas of trees, mountains, etc.
 Gambara Devathavo are devatas of the villages
 Graha Devathavo are devatas of planets

Scriptures
Some well-known Hindu-Buddhist heavenly beings belong to the group of devatas, such as apsaras or vidhyadaris (female cloud and water spirits) and their male counterparts, the gandharvas (heavenly musicians). Devatas often occur in many Buddhist Jatakas, Hindu epics such as the Ramayana and the Mahabharata and in many other Buddhist holy scriptures.
The island of Bali is nicknamed Pulau Dewata (Indonesian: "islands of devata or island of gods") because of its vivid Hindu culture and traditions. In Indonesia, the term hyang is equivalent to devata. In Hinduism, the devatas that guard the eight, nine and ten cardinal points are called Lokapala (Guardians of the Directions) or, more specifically in ancient Java tradition, Dewata Nawa Sanga (Guardians of Nine Directions).

See also
 Demigod
 Surya Majapahit

References

 Palani, Sivasiva.  "New Angles On Angels."  Hinduism Today, Sep 1992.  Accessed 11 May 2006.
 Krishna, Nanditha.  "Grounded in wisdom."  Newindpress on Sunday, April 26, 2003.  Accessed 11 May 2006.
 Chopra, Deepak: Life after Death, The Burden of Proof, Chapter 11 "Guides and Messengers" Three Rivers Press, 2008.

External links
 Devata.org - Research on Khmer Women in Divine Context
 Photos and Articles about Devata temples in Cambodia, Thailand & Laos

Hindu deities
Tutelary deities